Jarrell Miller (born July 15, 1988)  is an undefeated American professional boxer and former kickboxer who competes in the heavyweight division. He first came to prominence in 2007 when he competed for the New Jersey Tigers in the World Combat League and made it to the finals of the New York Golden Gloves tournament that same year. Miller was due to challenge Anthony Joshua for the WBA (Super), IBF, WBO, and IBO heavyweight titles in 2019, but was denied a license to box after failing multiple drug tests.

In 2018, Miller was ranked as the world's seventh-best heavyweight by BoxRec, and eighth by The Ring.

Early life
Miller was born and raised in Brooklyn, New York. His mother is of Belizean and Irish descent, his father is of Haitian and Dominican descent. He took up Muay Thai at the age of 14, as a way to defend himself after being attacked on the street. He began boxing at the age of 16. Miller has highlighted some of his early boxing idols, including Mike Tyson and Riddick Bowe.

Boxing career

Amateur career
As an amateur boxer, Miller reached the final of the 2007 New York Golden Gloves Heavyweight tournament at the Madison Square Garden in New York, where he lost to Tor Hamer on points (4-1). Miller had an amateur record of 10–1, with 7 wins by knockout. Miller had a limited amateur career due to him being forced to turn professional as he was also a professional kickboxer.

Professional career
Miller made his professional boxing debut at the age of 21 on July 18, 2009 at the Plattduetsche Park Restaurant, in Franklin Square, New York. His opponent was an experienced 36-year-old Darius Whitson in a scheduled 4-round bout. Miller won the fight by TKO in the first round due to the ring doctor stopping the match because of a cut Darius Whitson received from an accidental headbutt. After a 22-month break from boxing, in May 2011, Miller defeated Isaac Villanueva via third-round TKO at the Roseland Ballroom in Manhattan.

Miller took another gap from boxing for 11 months, returning to the ring in April 2012 at the Cordon Bleu in Woodhaven, New York against American boxer Donnie Crawford, stopping him 2 minutes and 38 seconds of round one. In December of that year, Miller defeated 36-year-old Tyrone Gibson at the Roseland Ballroom.

On January 19, 2013, Miller was in a scheduled 4-round bout against 22-year-old up-and-comer Joey Dawejko (7-1-1, 3 KOs) at the Mohegan Sun Casino in Uncasville, Connecticut. The fight went the full 4 rounds and was ruled as a draw on all scorecards 37–37, 3 times. Miller was deducted 2 points for pushing during the fight.

In September 2013, Miller defeated Tobias Rice, when Rice failed to come out for round 3. Two months later, Miller knocked out 34-year-old Willie Chisolm in 2 rounds. In December, Miller fought 39-year-old southpaw Sylvester Barron (8-2, 3 KOs). Miller outclassed Barron in the scheduled 6-round fight, knocking him down once in round 1 and again in round 2 before referee Benjy Esteves Jr. stopped the fight. In January 2014, Miller fought at the Harrah's Philadelphia in Chester, Pennsylvania against Jon Hill (6-4, 5 KOs), winning the fight via technical knockout in round 4.

On May 5, Miller fought at the Millennium Theater in Brighton Beach, New York against Joshua Harris, who was a last-minute replacement moving up from cruiserweight. Miller, who weighed in 50 pounds heavier, knocked out and stopped Harris inside 2 rounds. Miller was originally scheduled to fight Vincent Thompson, who had been arrested before the event for his role in six armed bank robberies. This win ensured Miller would qualify for a vacant ten-round New York State Heavyweight title showdown against Derric Rossy.

Miller next fought in November against Rodricka Ray in a scheduled 6-round fight. Miller won via unanimous decision with the judges scoring in his favor 60–54, 59–55, and 59–55. On January 1, 2015, Miller fought in California for the first time since turning professional. His opponent was 35-year-old Aaron Kinch. The fight went a full 6 rounds as Miller won a shut out decision 60–54, 60–54, and 60–53.

Raymond Ochieng (26-18-3, 21 KOs) called out Miller following his win over David Rodriguez in 2014. Miller accepted and they faced off in April 2015. Miller won via first-round TKO. Miller next had a scheduled fight on June 4 against 41-year-old Damon McCreary (15-4, 11 KOs). Miller won the bout via 2nd round stoppage after Miller gave McCreary a beating, until he slumped through the bottom ropes, falling through helpless and defenseless in a sitting position. Miller had two more bouts in 2015, finishing the year strong, stopping Excell Holmes and Akhror Muralimov inside the distance.

Rise up the ranks
Miller had his first fight of 2016 on January 23 at the Casino Del Sol in Tucson, Arizona for the interim WBA-NABA heavyweight title against Donovan Dennis (12-2, 10 KOs). Miller defeated Dennis when the fight was called by the referee at 2:31 of the 7th round. In the post-fight interview, Miller called out then IBF champion Charles Martin, WBC champion Deontay Wilder, Unified world champion Tyson Fury and Anthony Joshua. Miller took full distinction as NABA champion on February 1, after Shannon Briggs was stripped of the title.

It was announced that Miller, who was now ranked WBO #11, WBA #12 and IBF #15, would next fight on May 27, at the Seneca Niagara Resort & Casino in Niagara Falls, New York against Nick Guivas (12-3-2, 9 KOs) for the vacant WBO NABO Heavyweight title, previously held by Charles Martin. Miller kept his unbeaten run intact as he knocked out the over-matched Guivas in the 2nd-round. Miller used power shots to the body of Guivas to knock him down four times in the fight, with two of the knockdowns coming in the 1st round. Referee Dick Pakozdi stopped the fight officially at 1:26 of the 2nd round with Miller claiming the vacant title. In the post-fight interview, Miller again called out top heavyweights Wladimir Klitschko, Tyson Fury, Anthony Joshua and Deontay Wilder.

Salita Promotions announced that Miller would be fighting on the main event of ShoBox: The New Generation on August 19 at the outdoor Rhinos Stadium in Rochester, New York. His opponent would be his toughest test to date, seasoned veteran Fred Kassi (18-5-1, 10 KOs). Miller, determined to stop Kassi inside the distance, said, "I'm ready to put his lights out like I do everybody else. I know he's durable and a little older than me. He's a tough guy and he can take a beating. So far, he's only been stopped once. I'll be the second." Miller weighed in his heaviest at 296.5 pounds since turning pro. The fight only lasted three rounds, with Miller coming out on top. After the third round, Kassi complained that he had injured his right hand and did not come out for the 4th round. Kassi started well in the opening round, connecting his shots, but ultimately became a punch bag for the remainder of the fight leaning against the ropes while Miller unloaded with body shots. Miller showed off his aggressive style by stopping Kassi.

In September 2016, Miller accused his promoter of breaching their contract.  Although nothing was disclosed, rumours surfaced it was because of Miller's recent fight purses where he stated he had been underpaid. Miller started making noise in December 2016 when new WBO heavyweight champion Joseph Parker listed him as a potential first defence along with British boxers Hughie Fury and David Price. The news initially came when the WBO stated Parker could make a voluntary defence after mandatory challenger David Haye decided to take up a grudge match against fellow Brit Tony Bellew. Only fighting twice in 2016, Miller said that he was looking for the right opportunity. Miller started calling out Joseph Parker, saying he would fight him anywhere.

Miller vs. Washington
On June 27, 2017 it was announced that Miller would fight former world title challenger Gerald Washington (18-1-1, 12 KOs) on the undercard of Garcia-Broner at the Barclays Center in New York on July 25 in a 10-round bout, this was Miller's first fight back after an 11-month layoff. Miller weighed in a career high 298.8 pounds while Washington weighed 248 pounds, 9 pounds heavier than when he challenged Wilder for the WBC title in February 2017. After the weigh in, the face off was tense as Miller was trash-talking Washington, who never did any trash-talking back. Miller then threw his promotional cap towards Washington as the face off was broken up.

Miller broke down Washington over 8 rounds eventually forcing the corner and referee stopping the fight. Washington had a good opening round, but Miller took control landing power shots and causing heavy punishment. Washington suffered his second consecutive stoppage loss. Stephen Espinoza, Showtime Sports general manager praised Miller and said he could soon feature on 'Showtime Championship Boxing'. Miller spoke with Showtime after the fight and called Washington a warrior, "I knew there would be a give and take in this fight. It's one thing to fight when you have stamina; it's another to fight when you're tired. I was trying to out-think him [...] Gerald was very tough. It was a very good fight that had me thinking. My power was there. I took the hard way back coming in off of a layoff. Gerald definitely pushed me and motivated me. I had to rely on my brain and my power." Miller received a $70,000 purse for the win, while Washington earned $50,000.

Miller vs. Wach
On September 24, 2017 HBO announced that Miller would appear as a co-feature alongside fellow New York fighter Daniel Jacobs on a card which would take place on November 11 at the Nassau Veterans Memorial Coliseum in Uniondale, New York. This would be the second event at the Coliseum since it re-opened in July 2017. Prior to that date, no event had taken place there since 1986. A day later it was revealed that 37 year old former world title challenger Mariusz Wach (33-2, 17 KOs) would be Miller's opponent for his HBO debut. Miller weighed 283.4 pounds, showing that he had lost weight rather than gain more, as he had done in his last two fights. Wach weighed a career-high 268 pounds, also making him the heaviest opponent Miller had fought.

Miller defeated Wach by TKO in the ninth round, moving him closer to a potential world title fight. Miller had a tougher time than expected as Wach pressured him many times. The fight was stopped by the referee and Wach's corner during the ninth round due to Wach suffering a hand injury. The injury had been a problem for Wach from the early rounds but seemed to get worse to the point where Wach was no longer using his right hand from round 7, other than for just an occasional shot. With the injury, Wach was unable to hold back Miller. The ringside doctor ended the fight at 1:02 of round nine.

In the post fight interview, Miller said, “The next fight on the table for me that makes sense is Dillian Whyte or Joseph Parker. Those 2 fights make sense to me, because who are they fighting? Parker fought Hughie Fury, who I know didn’t deserve a title shot. Whyte is not a mandatory [for WBC champion Deontay Wilder]. I think Dillian Whyte should come and fight me. I’d be a good fight, and then the winner of that gets AJ or Deontay.” Talking about Wach, he said, “He hit me with a couple of shots, and it hurt me. The main thing was to try and stay on his chest. I gave myself a rating of an F, because it wasn’t my best performance and I was lighter. For the fight, Miller landed 204 of 620 punches thrown (33%), whilst Wach landed 95 of 328 (29%). Miller's debut on HBO averaged 673,000 viewers and peaked at 739,000 viewers.

Miller vs. Duhaupas
On January 24, 2018 according to an interview with Sky Sports, Miller stated his intention to fight fellow New York boxer Trevor Bryan (19-0, 13 KOs) on April 28 at the Barclays Center in New York on HBO. Miller believed he should be next in line for a world title fight. Speaking to The Ring, he said, “Yes, we are working on Trevor Bryan, but his promoter is Don King, who is not the easiest to work with.” A deal was not reached and on February 6, ESPN reported that Miller would instead fight 37 year old French contender and former world title challenger Johann Duhaupas (37-4, 24 KOs) as part of a doubleheader including Daniel Jacobs vs. Maciej Sulęcki, at the Barclays Center, in Brooklyn, New York on April 28, live on HBO. Duhaupas was ranked #7 by the WBA, #8 by the WBC and #13 by the IBF at heavyweight. At the weight in, Miller came in at 304¼ pounds, which was 21 pounds heavier than what he weighed for his previous fight. Duhaupas weighed 244.2 pounds. 7,892 fans attended the event. On fight night, going the 12 round distance for the first time as a professional, Miller outworked Duhaupas in a one-sided fight winning with the scores of 119–109, 119–109, and 117–111. Miller was mostly the aggressor, not allowing Duhaupas to get much offence in. Duhaupas landed clean occasionally when he did let his hands go. Miller landed 261 of 782 total punches (33.4%), 185 being power punches, compared to Duhaupas' 128 landed of his 538 (23.8%), with 67 being power shots. It was said that with the win, Miller became the WBA mandatory challenger. After the fight, Miller stated he wanted Joshua to fight him in Brooklyn. The fight averaged 706,000 viewers and peaked at 834,000 on HBO.

Miller vs. Adamek
On June 16, 2018 the IBF ordered a final eliminator between Miller and Kubrat Pulev (25-1, 13 KOs), with a purse bid taking place on June 25. The winner would become the mandatory challenger to Anthony Joshua's IBF belt. At the purse bid, Epic Sports & Entertainment made the winning bid of $2,111,111, much higher than the $1,000,010, which was placed by Team Sauerland. The bid meant Miller would be earning his highest purse at $527,777.75 US dollars. According to Epic Sports, the contracts were sent within two days of the purse bid. By 2 July, there was no deal made. It was said that Miller's camp were stalling, likely due to the fight taking place in Bulgaria. Miller's promoter Dmitry Salita confirmed negotiations were still ongoing however the biggest hurdle was the venue. According to IBF public relations director Jeanette Salazar, Miller had 15 days from when he received the contract to agree or the IBF would go back to the rankings. At the time, the next highest challenger was Hughie Fury, who was inserted at #5 by the IBF in June. Negotiations between Pulev and Miller broke down on July 10.

On August 2, 2018 former two weight world champion Tomasz Adamek (53-5, 31 KOs) spoke of his interest to fight Miller after it was announced that Miller's next fight was scheduled in Chicago, a town with a big Polish community. Artur Szpilka was also a name mentioned however there was reports stating he would fight Mariusz Wach. According to ESPN's Dan Rafael and others close to Hearn, the fight was a mismatch. The fight was later announced to take place at a 10,000 capacity Wintrust Arena in Chicago on October 6, 2018. Miller stayed in contention for a world title fight after knocking out Adamek in round 2. Miller weighed his career-heaviest at 317 pounds compared to Adamek who weighed 227 pounds. Miller knocked Adamek down after hurting him with a left and then landing a number of power shots to put him down on one knee. Adamek was given a count by the referee and decided not to get back to his feet. In round 1, Miller stalked Adamek around the ring, hitting him with hard body and head shots. Adamek was unable to keep a distance.

Miller vs. Dinu
Knowing he would likely not get a shot at Anthony Joshua in April 2019, Miller's handlers focused their attention on the WBA 'regular' belt. At the time, the titleholder Manuel Charr was going through a failed drugs test, as the belt was not yet vacant, Greg Cohen, Miller's co-promoter stated he would likely fight 45 year old boxer Fres Oquendo or WBA 'interim' champion Trevor Bryan. On October 19, terms were agreed for Miller to challenge Oquendo (37-8, 24 KOs), for the soon-to-be vacant WBA 'regular' belt on November 17 at the Boardwalk Hall in Atlantic City, New Jersey. Oquendo, last fought in 2014, was legally owed a WBA 'regular' title opportunity after winning a lawsuit on the back of his loss against then belt-holder Ruslan Chagaev. On October 24, ESPN reported, Oquendo, who would have earned $500,000 in fighting Miller, turned down the fight as there would no be 'enough time to properly implement Voluntary Anti-Doping Association testing for performance-enhancing drugs'. Romania boxer Bogdan Dinu accepted fight Miller on the same date. Dinu was ranked #9 by the WBA and #13 by the IBF at heavyweight. A press conference two days later confirmed the card would take place at the Kansas Star Arena and Casino in Mulvane, Kansas. Top Rank's Bob Arum stated he would write a letter to the WBA informing them Bryant Jennings would be available and not skipped. At the time, Jennings was ranked #7 by WBA ahead of Dinu, who was ranked #9. Miller weighed 315¼ pounds, 78 pounds more than Dinu, who came in at 237¼ pounds. After making a pre-fight prediction that he would win the fight inside 5 rounds, Miller knocked Dinu down and out for the 10-count in round 4 of their scheduled 12-round bout. The fight marked Miller's second win in 6 weeks. The opening 3 rounds where competitive. Dinu was able to land his jab, but backed off a little after he felt Miller's power. After the fight, Miller stated he wanted to fight a British boxer in 2019. Over the 4 rounds, Miller landed 54 punches of 204 thrown (27%), this included 35 power shots and Dinu landed 69 of 240 punches thrown (29%), which included 39 jabs landed.

Canceled fights due to failed drug tests

Miller vs. Joshua
Miller was announced as Anthony Joshua's next opponent in February 2019, and was due to challenge for Joshua's WBA (Super), IBF, WBO, and IBO heavyweight titles at Madison Square Garden in June 2019.  Prior to the scheduled fight, Miller tested positive for GW501516, causing the New York State Athletic Commission (NYSAC) to deny him a license to box. Further tests proved positive for EPO and HGH. Miller was dropped from the card. Because he was not licensed at the time, the NYSAC could not take disciplinary action for the failed tests, beyond denying the application for a license. The WBA, however, imposed a six-month ban and removed Miller from their rankings. The ruling did not necessarily mean Miller could not box during that time as he could, in theory, have applied for a license in another state (due to not receiving a suspension by the NYSAC). But any fight scheduled would not have been sanctioned by the WBA.

Miller vs. Forrest
Following the suspension by the WBA, he was scheduled to make his ring return against Jerry Forrest on July 9, 2020, at the MGM Grand Conference Center in Paradise, Nevada. On June 27, it was reported that Miller had yet again failed a pre-fight drug test, returning positive results for the banned substance GW501516. He received a suspension by the Nevada Athletic Commission (NAC) on July 2, with the suspension being extended on August 5 by an NAC five-member panel at their monthly commission hearing.

Kickboxing career
Miller began kickboxing at the age of 14. His break-out performances as a kickboxer came while representing the New Jersey Tigers in the World Combat League in the 2007–08 season. On May 3, 2008, he defeated K-1 veteran Pat Barry at the WCL Eastern & Western Conference Finals in San Antonio, Texas, the biggest feat of his career at that point. Miller had an amateur kickboxing record of 14–0, 7 KO's.

Following the WCL's demise, Miller went on to rack up a 19-0 (8 KOs) record as a professional kickboxer on New York's heavyweight Muay Thai scene while also turning professional as a boxer.

His exploits won him admirers, and in 2012, after he knocked out Radu Spinghel in New York City, he was recruited by K-1, historically the world's premier kickboxing organization.

In his promotional debut, he went up against mixed martial arts knockout artist Jack May at the K-1 World Grand Prix 2012 in Los Angeles on September 8, 2012 with a place at the 2012 K-1 World Grand Prix at stake. Miller was able to knock May out with an uppercut in the first round to advance to the K-1 World Grand Prix 2012 in Tokyo Final 16 on October 14, 2012 where he was drawn against Arnold Oborotov. Although Oborotov caused some problems with his low kicks, Miller was able to dominate with his superior boxing ability. He cruised to a unanimous decision win after sending the Lithuanian to the canvas in round one.

At the K-1 World Grand Prix 2012 Final on March 15, 2013 in Zagreb, Croatia, he battled Mirko Cro Cop in the quarter-finals. The panel of judges all scored the bout for Cro Cop by unanimous decision, handing Miller his first professional loss and sending him out of the tournament.

He signed with SUPERKOMBAT in August 2013. Replacing Sergei Kharitonov who withdrew from the fight due to a finger injury, Miller rematched Mirko Cro Cop at Glory 17: Los Angeles in Inglewood, California on June 21, 2014. He lost by unanimous decision. Miller had a professional kickboxing record of 22–2, 10 KO's.

Doping suspension
In 2014, Miller was suspended for nine months by the California State Athletic Commission (CSAC) after methylhexaneamine was found in a urine sample he gave for Glory 17: Los Angeles.

Career highlights

Defeated Radu Spinghel - TKO (1) - Qualified For The K-1 World Grand Prix 2012 in Tokyo Final 16
Defeated Jack May - KO (1) - K-1 World Grand Prix 2012 in Los Angeles
Defeated Arnold Oborotov - UD-3 - K-1 World Grand Prix 2012 in Tokyo Final 16 - First Round

Professional boxing record

References

External links
 Official website
 
Jarrell Miller - Profile, News Archive & Current Rankings at Box.Live

1988 births
Living people
African-American boxers
African-American sportsmen
American male boxers
American male kickboxers
American Muay Thai practitioners
American people of Belizean descent
American people of Irish descent
American sportspeople of Haitian descent
American sportspeople of Dominican Republic descent
American sportspeople in doping cases
Boxers from New York City
Doping cases in boxing
Doping cases in kickboxing
Heavyweight boxers
Heavyweight kickboxers
Kickboxers from New York (state)
Sportspeople from Brooklyn
21st-century African-American sportspeople
20th-century African-American people